A microaerophile is a microorganism that requires environments containing lower levels of dioxygen than that are present in the atmosphere (i.e. < 21% O2; typically 2–10% O2) for optimal growth. A more restrictive interpretation requires the microorganism to be obligate in this requirement.  Many microaerophiles are also capnophiles, requiring an elevated concentration of carbon dioxide (e.g. 10% CO2 in the case of Campylobacter species).

The original definition of a microaerophile has been criticized for being too restrictive and not accurate enough compared to similar categories. The broader term microaerobe has been coined to describe microbes able to respire oxygen "within microoxic environments by using high-affinity terminal oxidase".

Culture
Microaerophiles are traditionally cultivated in candle jars.  Candle jars are containers into which a lit candle is introduced before sealing the container's airtight lid.  The candle's flame burns until extinguished by oxygen deprivation, creating a carbon dioxide-rich, oxygen-poor atmosphere.

Newer oxystat bioreactor methods allow for more precise control of gas levels in the microaerobic environment, using a probe to measure the oxygen concentration or redox potential in real time. Ways to control oxygen intake include gas-generating packs and gas exchange.

As oxystat bioreactors are expensive to buy and run, lower-cost solutions have been devised. For example, the Micro-Oxygenated Culture Device (MOCD) is a system involving ordinary flasks, oxygen-permeable tubes, sensors, and water pumps. Aeration is done by pumping the culture medium through the tubes.

Examples
A wide variety of microaerobic conditions exist in the world: in human bodies, underwater, etc. Many bacteria from these sources are microaerobes, some of which are also microaerophiles.
 Some members of Campylobacterales are microaerophilic:
 Campylobacter species are microaerophilic.
 Helicobacter pylori (previously identified as a Campylobacter), a species of Campylobacterota that has been linked to peptic ulcers and some types of gastritis
 Many members of Lactobacillus sensu lato (see Lactobacillaceae) are microaerophiles. As facultative anaerobes, they do survive anaerobic conditions, but grow better with a little oxygen.
 Magnetospirillum gryphiswaldense and Magnetospira sp. QH-2 are aquatic microaerophilic magnetotactic bacteria. The formation of magnetite in such bacteria in general require microaerobic conditions.

See also
 Aerobic respiration
 Anaerobic respiration
 Facultative anaerobe
 Fermentation
 Obligate aerobe
 Obligate anaerobe
 Oxygenation (environmental)

References

External links
 Characterization of an unclassified microaerophilic bacterium associated with gastroenteritis.

Microbial growth and nutrition